Løkenfeltet is a village in Nannestad municipality, Norway. It is located in Holter in southern Nannestad west of Jessheim and Sand. Its population (2005) is 599.

References

Villages in Akershus